John Albert Aiken (17 March 1918 – 3 September 2016) was an Australian politician who was a member of the Queensland Legislative Assembly.

Biography
Aiken was born in Kensington, New South Wales, the son of John Hugh O'Neill Aiken and his wife Clare Anastasia (née Wond). He was educated at Hornsby Public and Chatswood Intermediate high schools before attending the East Sydney Technical College where he graduated with honours in wool technology.

After arriving in Queensland he owned a newsagency in Charleville from 1947 until 1954 and afterwards owned a general store in Cooladdi. He then was a grazier and bloodstock breeder.

On 12 February 1945 he married Barbara Davidson and together they had a son and two daughters. He died in Brisbane at age 98.

Public career
Aiken won the seat of Warrego for the Labor Party at the 1969 Queensland state election. He held it for five and a half years until his defeat by Neil Turner of the Country Party at the 1974 Queensland state election.

References

Members of the Queensland Legislative Assembly
1918 births
Australian Labor Party members of the Parliament of Queensland
2016 deaths